Flournoy Township is one of eleven townships in Thurston County, Nebraska, United States. The population was 272 at the 2020 census.

The Village of Thurston lies within the Township.

References

External links
City-Data.com

Townships in Thurston County, Nebraska
Townships in Nebraska